Osinki is the name of several inhabited localities in Russia.

Urban localities
Osinki, Samara Oblast, an urban-type settlement in Bezenchuksky District of Samara Oblast

Rural localities
Osinki, Ivanovo Oblast, a village in Pestyakovsky District of Ivanovo Oblast
Osinki, Kirov Oblast, a village in Kotelnichsky District of Kirov Oblast
Osinki, name of several other rural localities